Mercedes M. Teixido is an American visual artist. She is the Loren Barton Babcock Miller Fine Arts Professor at Pomona College in Claremont, California.

References

External links
Personal website
Faculty page at Pomona College

Year of birth missing (living people)
Living people
Pomona College faculty
American women painters
American watercolorists
American performance artists
American women performance artists
American installation artists
American women installation artists
Wake Forest University alumni
University of Arizona alumni
21st-century American women artists
21st-century American painters